Emisum or Iemsium ruled the ancient Near East city-state of Larsa from 1940 BC to 1912 BC (short chronology). He was an Amorite.

See also

Chronology of the ancient Near East

Notes

External links

Amorite kings
20th-century BC Sumerian kings
Kings of Larsa
20th-century BC people